David Joseph England (born December 30, 1969) is an American stunt performer and former professional snowboarder. He was born in 1969 to Bonfield and Winnifred England. He is best known as one of the stars of the reality stunt show Jackass.

Career
England was once a professional snowboarder and is featured in several of Kingpin Productions' snowboarding videos, including "Bulletproof" and "Back in Black". He was founder of the snowboarding magazine Skintight Magazine. He once worked as the field editor for Snowboarder Magazine and was the editor of  Blunt magazine, the sister snowboarding magazine to skateboarding's Big Brother. England also appears in the 2008 film Shred, co-starring Tom Green. The film, about a snowboarding school run by England's character, was filmed at Big White, a ski resort in Canada.

Role in Jackass
England gets involved in stunts and pranks much like the rest of the cast, but he is the first one to participate in something when fecal matter is involved. England proclaimed himself on the Jackass Number Two DVD commentary that he is the "world's first professional shitter", in as much as he gets paid to defecate on TV.

In Jackass 2.5, England jokingly claims that he is the only proven person in the world that is capable of defecating and even vomiting on command, although he finds urinating on command to be difficult.

In one stunt on Jackass, England eats a number of uncooked ingredients that he thinks would be suitable for making an omelette. He then forces himself to become sick by eating raw eggs and proceeds to vomit into a bowl, which he then empties into a pan to fry. Finally, he, very enthusiastically, eats the omelette he has just made. One of England's skits ("Poo Diaper") almost did not make it to TV. This skit involves England reaching into a garbage can and eating out of a baby's diaper, which contains chocolate pudding. Johnny Knoxville told MTV to keep the skit, and after many debates MTV let Jackass keep "Poo Diaper".

Personal life
Dave is married to Shawna England, with whom he has two sons, named Van and Clyde. He also has two children from a previous relationship. England is a vegetarian.

England has a reputation for turning into 'Darf', his drunken ill-tempered persona, when he drinks alcohol to excess. He has spent brief periods in jail in the United States, New Zealand, and Japan.

During the Bathroom Break Podcast with former Jackass and CKY crew member Chris Raab, Dave stated he lost one of his testicles after suffering a double hernia during a snowboard accident in New Zealand in 1997.

Filmography

Television

Film

Web series

Music videos

Video games

References

External links
Official website

1969 births
People from Ojai, California
American male snowboarders
American stunt performers
Jackass (TV series)
Living people